The X-24 is one of the few configurations of X-type engines known to have been produced. The design consists of four banks of six cylinders with a common crankshaft. This is lighter than other multi-bank designs, which require multiple crankshafts. Few of the X-24 engines developed saw service, and their production lifetimes were very limited. Postwar developments of the turbojet and turbofan engines obviated the need for large piston aircraft engines of this type.

In the United Kingdom, Rolls-Royce produced the  Vulture X-24 based on the Peregrine (which was itself a highly developed Kestrel). The Peregrine proved troublesome, and the Vulture inherited many of the Peregrine's problems, as well as some of its own, and proved unsuccessful. Development work on all these engines ended in 1941 as Rolls-Royce concentrated on the Griffon and Merlin.

Meanwhile, in Germany, the substantially larger  Daimler-Benz DB 604, intended for use in the Bomber B program, was cancelled on instructions from the RLM in 1942.

References 

Piston engine configurations